Oconee Township is one of eighteen townships in Platte County, Nebraska, United States. The population was 499 at the 2020 census. A 2021 estimate placed the township's population at 490.

The Village of Monroe lies within the Township.

History
Oconee Township was established in 1908. It was likely named after Oconee, Illinois.

See also
County government in Nebraska

References

External links
City-Data.com

Townships in Platte County, Nebraska
Townships in Nebraska